WWLN (90.5 FM) is a  radio station  licensed to Lincoln, Maine, United States.  The station is owned by Light of Life Ministries and simulcasts Oakland, Maine, based WMDR-FM as God's Country. It uses the same logo as WMDR-FM.

References

External links
WWLN's official website

Radio stations established in 2010
Southern Gospel radio stations in the United States
WLN
Lincoln, Maine